Julien Ricaud (born 28 January 1985) is a French professional footballer who plays for Avranches as a defensive midfielder.

After progressing through the youth ranks at Laval, he began his senior career with Championnat de France amateur (CFA) side Genêts Anglet in 2005. Two years later, Ricaud signed for CFA rivals Compiègne, spending one season there before joining Pau. In the summer of 2010, he was signed by newly promoted Championnat National club Chamois Niortais on a free transfer.

Ricaud became an important figure in the Niort team over the following three seasons, often partnering Johan Gastien in the centre of midfield. He made 36 league appearances in the 2011–12 season as the side finished as runners-up in the National, thereby winning promotion to Ligue 2, the second tier of French football. At the end of the 2012–13 season it was announced that Ricaud, along with four other players, would not be re-signing with Niort for the following campaign.

References
Specific

General
Julien Ricaud profile at foot-national.com
Julien Ricaud career statistics at FootballDatabase.eu

People from Villeneuve-sur-Lot
1985 births
Living people
French footballers
Association football midfielders
Stade Lavallois players
AFC Compiègne players
Pau FC players
Chamois Niortais F.C. players
Vendée Poiré-sur-Vie Football players
US Avranches players
Ligue 2 players
Championnat National players
Genêts Anglet players
Sportspeople from Lot-et-Garonne
Footballers from Nouvelle-Aquitaine